Kidd, Montana is in Beaverhead County, Montana, between Dell and Redrock, along Interstate 15 going north towards Dillon, Montana, 59725.

References

Beaverhead County, Montana